Cataratas del Iguazú International Airport , also known as Mayor Carlos Eduardo Krause Airport, is an airport in Misiones Province, Argentina serving the city of Puerto Iguazú and providing access to the nearby Iguazú Falls. It is the easternmost Argentine airport served by scheduled flights.

Airlines and destinations

Statistics

See also

Transport in Argentina
List of airports in Argentina

References

External links
 Official website
 Aeropuertos Argentina 2000
 
 

Airports in Misiones Province